Zorc is a surname. Notable people with the surname include:

Anže Zorc (born 1994), Slovenian footballer
Dieter Zorc (1939–2007), German footballer, father of Michael
Michael Zorc (born 1962), German footballer and executive
R. David Zorc (born 1943), American linguist

Slovene-language surnames